The British Soap Award for Best Leading Performer is an award presented annually by The British Soap Awards. The award was introduced to the ceremony in 2022, succeeding the categories for Best Actress and Best Actor as a gender neutral replacement. Alongside Best British Soap and Best Family, the award is voted for by the public. An initial longlist is announced, and after an initial round of voting, the five performers with the highest votes advance to the shortlist, after which voting is opened for a second time. The award is currently held by Emmerdale actress Paige Sandhu.

Winners and nominees

Wins by soap

Notes

References

Soap opera awards
The British Soap Awards